Raquel Chumpitaz (born 11 February 1962) is a Peruvian former volleyball player who competed in the 1980 Summer Olympics. She was a member of the Peruvian team that won second place in the World Championship in 1982.

Raquel Chumpitaz is married to Mark West and is not currently coaching at Shoreline Community College. She also is the club director and head coach at Spaceneedle Volleyball Foundation.

Raquel also has a son named Matt West who also plays volleyball. He played college volleyball at Peperdine University and is currently playing for Klando Volleyball.

She owns volleyball club in Washington: Space needle Volleyball Foundation (S.n.v.f.)

References

1962 births
Living people
Peruvian women's volleyball players
Olympic volleyball players of Peru
Volleyball players at the 1980 Summer Olympics
Pan American Games medalists in volleyball
Pan American Games silver medalists for Peru
Pan American Games bronze medalists for Peru
Volleyball players at the 1979 Pan American Games
Volleyball players at the 1991 Pan American Games
Medalists at the 1979 Pan American Games
Medalists at the 1991 Pan American Games
20th-century Peruvian women